Leirfjord is a municipality in Nordland county, Norway. It is part of the Helgeland traditional region. The administrative centre of the municipality is the village of Leland. Other villages in Leirfjord include Bardalssjøen and Sundøy. The large Helgeland Bridge is partly located in the municipality, connecting it to Alstahaug Municipality and the town of Sandnessjøen.

The  municipality is the 213th largest by area out of the 356 municipalities in Norway. Leirfjord is the 264th most populous municipality in Norway with a population of 2,257.

General information

The municipality of Leirfjord was established on 1 July 1915 when it was separated from the municipality of Stamnes. Initially, the municipality had 2,003 residents. In 1945, a small part of Nesna Municipality (population: 45) was merged into Leirfjord. During the 1960s, there were many municipal mergers across Norway due to the work of the Schei Committee. On 1 January 1964, Leirfjord Municipality (population: 1,936) was merged with the parts of Nesna Municipality located south of the Ranfjorden (population: 580) and the parts of Tjøtta Municipality on the island of Alsta (population: 180) to form a new, larger municipality of Leirfjord.

Name
The municipality is named after the Leirfjorden. The old name of the fjord was probably just Leiri, derived from the name of the river Leira, which has its mouth in the end of the fjord. The river name is derived from the word leirr which means "clay".

Coat of arms
The coat of arms was granted on 30 October 1992. The official blazon is "Or, a cross raguly vert". This means the arms have a field (background) that has a tincture of Or which means it is commonly colored yellow, but if it is made out of metal, then gold is used. The charge is cross with edges that are designed with a raguly edge. It symbolizes forestry and agriculture in the municipality as well as the central location of the north–south and east–west roads through the municipality. The arms were designed by Jarle E. Henriksen from the nearby town of Sandnessjøen.

Churches
The Church of Norway has one parish within the municipality of Leirfjord. It is part of the Nord-Helgeland prosti (deanery) in the Diocese of Sør-Hålogaland.

Geography

The municipality of Leirfjord is centered on the Leirfjorden, with most of the municipality on the mainland and a small part on the northeastern part of the island of Alsta. The Sundøy Bridge connects the mainland to the northeastern part of the island of Alsta and the Helgeland Bridge connects it to the rest of Alsta and the town of Sandnessjøen. The Ranfjorden runs along the northern part of Leirfjord and the Vefsnfjorden runs along the southern part of the municipality.

Government
All municipalities in Norway, including Leirfjord, are responsible for primary education (through 10th grade), outpatient health services, senior citizen services, unemployment and other social services, zoning, economic development, and municipal roads. The municipality is governed by a municipal council of elected representatives, which in turn elect a mayor.  The municipality falls under the Alstahaug District Court and the Hålogaland Court of Appeal.

Municipal council
The municipal council of Leirfjord is made up of 19 representatives that are elected to four year terms. The party breakdown of the council is as follows:

Notable people 
 Gunvald Ludvigsen (born 1949 in Leirfjord) a Norwegian politician; Mayor of Eid 2003-2005
 Roger Johansen (born 1973 in Leirfjord) a Norwegian ice sledge hockey player; competed at the 2010 Winter Paralympics

References

External links
Municipal fact sheet from Statistics Norway 

 
Municipalities of Nordland
1915 establishments in Norway